is a former Japanese football player. His brother Takafumi Hori is also footballer.

Playing career
Hori was born in Kanagawa Prefecture on November 28, 1964. After graduating from Waseda University, he played for Yokohama Flügels. He played many matches as defender during the 1992 J.League Cup. However he did not play much in 1993 and retired at the end of the 1993 season.

Club statistics

References

External links

1964 births
Living people
Waseda University alumni
Association football people from Kanagawa Prefecture
Japanese footballers
Japan Soccer League players
J1 League players
Yokohama Flügels players
Association football defenders